Erik Halfdan Meyn (born July 3, 1955) is a Norwegian journalist, former TV-host and TV-director. He works in Norwegian Broadcasting Corporation in Norway. In 1996, Meyn was one of the first to attempt to use the Internet as a source of entertainment (rather infotainment) in the live TV-show "Spider" or "NRK2 Spider".

Erik Meyn is probably the first contemporary Norwegian TV personality who understood the new possibilities of the World Wide Web. Meyn tried to explain this to a TV audience through the TV series "Spider" - and was met with skepticism.

Today, NRK (the Norwegian state, public TV channel), use internet to broadcast TV. Meyn is currently composing music in his own band.

Meyn's TV series about internet was flawed by the fact that he only had a download ratio of a few Kb pr second - and his efforts to explain internet was lost to the general public. However; Meyn is also known as a truly original TV character. The show aired on Norwegian Broadcasting Corporation's channel NRK2 from September to December 1996.

The "NRK2 Spider" (first season) was presented at the TV-festival INPUT in Nantes, France, in 1997. In January 2011 the Norwegian Broadcasting Corporation republished all the 16 episodes of "NRK2 Spider" on their Internet video service called "NRK Nett-TV" in Norwegian.

References

External links

Erik Meyn on MySpace.com

Living people
1955 births